George Burns (born Nathan Birnbaum; January 20, 1896March 9, 1996) was an American comedian, actor, writer, and singer, and one of the few entertainers whose career successfully spanned vaudeville, radio, film and television. His arched eyebrow and cigar-smoke punctuation became familiar trademarks for over three-quarters of a century. He and his wife Gracie Allen appeared on radio, television and film as the comedy duo Burns and Allen.

At the age of 79, Burns experienced a sudden career revival as an amiable, beloved and unusually active comedy elder statesman in the 1975 film The Sunshine Boys, for which he won the Academy Award for Best Supporting Actor. Burns was only a Tony Award shy of being one of the few  EGOT award recipients in the American entertainment industry, winning an Emmy, a Grammy, and an Oscar. Burns became a centenarian in 1996, continuing to work until just weeks before his death of cardiac arrest at his home in Beverly Hills, shortly after his hundredth birthday.

Early life 
George Burns was born Nathan Birnbaum on January 20, 1896, in New York City, the ninth of 12 children born to Hadassah "Dorah" (née Bluth; 1857–1927) and Eliezer Birnbaum (1855–1903), known as Louis or Lippa, Jewish immigrants who had come to the United States from Ropczyce, Galicia, now Poland. Burns was a member of the First Roumanian-American Congregation.

His father was a substitute cantor at the local synagogue but usually worked as a coat presser. During the influenza epidemic of 1903, Lippe Birnbaum contracted the flu and died at the age of 47. Burns, called Nattie or Nate at the time, went to work to help support the family, shining shoes, running errands and selling newspapers.

When he got a job as a syrup maker in a local candy shop at age seven, Burns was "discovered", as he recalled long after:

One of the Burns brothers' first regular gigs was operating the curtains at the vaudeville and nickelodeon theatre of Frank Seiden, father of Joseph Seiden, who would later become a Yiddish film producer. Burns started smoking cigars when he was 14.

Burns was drafted into the United States Army when the U.S. entered World War I in 1917, but he failed the physical examination because he was extremely nearsighted. To hide his Jewish heritage, he adopted the stage name by which he would be known for the rest of his life. He later claimed that he selected the name of George Burns because there were two active star professional baseball players with the name (George H. Burns and George J. Burns, unrelated), each of whom would accumulate more than 2,000 hits and hold some major-league records. Burns also was reported to have taken George from his brother Izzy (who had first adopted the name because he hated his own) and Burns from the Burns Brothers Coal Company, from whose trucks he would steal coal as a youth.

His first wife was Hannah Siegel (stage name Hermosa Jose), one of his dance partners. The marriage lasted 26 weeks and only occurred because Siegel's family would not permit her to tour with Burns unless they were married. They divorced at the end of the tour.

Burns normally partnered with a girl, sometimes in an adagio dance routine, sometimes in comic patter. Though he had an apparent flair for comedy, he never quite clicked with any of his partners until he met Gracie Allen, a young Irish Catholic woman, in 1923. "And all of a sudden," he said in later years, "the audience realized I had a talent. They were right. I did have a talent—and I was married to her for 38 years." Burns wed Allen in 1926.

Stage to screen 
Burns and Allen began their career in motion pictures with a series of comic short films in the late 1920s and early 1930s, such as The Big Broadcast (1932) with Bing Crosby, both International House (1933) and Six of a Kind (1934) with W.C. Fields, The Big Broadcast of 1936 with Crosby again, The Big Broadcast of 1937 with Jack Benny, A Damsel in Distress (1937) with Fred Astaire and Joan Fontaine, and College Swing (1938) with Bob Hope and Martha Raye. Honolulu (1939) with Eleanor Powell and Robert Young would be Burns' last film for nearly 40 years although Gracie Allen starred in two more pictures without Burns.

In 1938, Paramount producer and managing director William LeBaron was planning a vehicle for Burns and Allen to team with established star Bing Crosby, with a script written by Don Hartman and Frank Butler. However, the story didn't fit Burns and Allen's style, so LeBaron ordered script rewrites to fit two male co-stars: Crosby and Bob Hope. The project became Road to Singapore (1940), the first in a long-running and popular series of "Road" films.

Radio stars 

Burns and Allen first appeared on radio as the comedy relief for bandleader Guy Lombardo. In his memoir The Third Time Around, Burns shared a letter from a college fraternity complaining that its weekly dance parties were interrupted by Burns and Allen routines.

Burns and Allen found their own show and radio audience, first airing on February 15, 1932. Their show was based on their classic stage routines and sketch comedy in which their style was woven into multiple smaller scenes, in a manner similar to that of the short films that they had made in Hollywood. They were also known for clever publicity stunts, such as Gracie's hunt for her missing brother that carried over into guest spots on other radio shows.

The couple was portrayed at first as unmarried, with Allen the object of Burns' affections as well as those of other cast members. Bandleaders Ray Noble (known for his phrase "Gracie, this is the first time we've ever been alone") and Artie Shaw played love interests for Gracie. Singer Tony Martin also played Gracie's unwilling love interest whom she comically threatened to fire if he would not reciprocate her romantic interest.

Over time, as ratings declined and with their audience's close familiarity with their real-life marriage, Burns and Allen adapted their radio show in the fall of 1941 to present them as a married couple. Artie Shaw, who also appeared as a character in some of the show's sketches, was the show's bandleader at one time. Allen's character also changed slightly during this era, as she would often now be mean to Burns.

As this format grew stale over the years, Burns and his fellow writers redeveloped the show as a situation comedy in the fall of 1941. The reformat focused on the couple's married life and their friends and neighbors, including Elvia Allman as Tootsie Sagwell, a man-hungry spinster in love with Bill Goodwin. The characters of Harry and Blanche Morton became a mainstay of the program.

As with The Jack Benny Program, the new George Burns & Gracie Allen Show portrayed Burns and Allen as entertainers with their own weekly radio show. Goodwin remained, and the music was now led by Meredith Willson (later to be better known for composing the Broadway musical The Music Man). Willson also played himself on the show as naïve, friendly and shy with women. The new format's success made it one of the few classic radio comedies to completely reinvent itself and regain great success.

Supporting players 
The supporting cast during this phase included Mel Blanc as the melancholy, ironically named "Happy Postman" (his catchphrase was "Remember, keep smiling!"); Bea Benaderet (later Cousin Pearl in The Beverly Hillbillies, Kate Bradley in Petticoat Junction and the voice of Betty Rubble in The Flintstones) and Hal March (later more famous as the host of The $64,000 Question) as neighbors Blanche and Harry Morton; and the various members of Gracie's ladies' club, the Beverly Hills Uplift Society. One running gag during this period, stretching into the television era, was Burns' questionable singing voice, as Gracie lovingly referred to her husband as "Sugar Throat." The show received and maintained a Top 10 rating for the rest of its radio life.

New network 
In the fall of 1949, after 12 years at NBC, the couple took the show back to its original network CBS, where they had risen to fame from 1932 to 1937. Their good friend Jack Benny reached a negotiating impasse with NBC over the corporation he set up ("Amusement Enterprises") to package his show, the better to put more of his earnings on a capital-gains basis and avoid the 80 percent taxes slapped on very high earners in the World War II period. When CBS executive William S. Paley convinced Benny to move to CBS (Paley, among other things, impressed Benny with his attitude that the performers make the network, not the other way around, as NBC chief David Sarnoff reputedly believed); Benny in turn convinced several NBC stars to join him, including Burns and Allen. Thus, CBS reaped the benefits when Burns and Allen moved to television in 1950.

Television

The George Burns and Gracie Allen Show 

On television, The George Burns and Gracie Allen Show put faces to some of the radio characters audiences had come to love although they were already familiar with Burns and Allen's faces from their films. A number of significant changes were seen in the show:
A parade of actors portrayed Harry Morton: Hal March, The Life of Riley alumnus John Brown, veteran film and television character actor Fred Clark, and future Mister Ed co-star Larry Keating.
 Burns often broke the fourth wall, and chatted with the home audience, telling understated jokes and commenting wryly about what show characters were doing or undoing. In later shows, he would actually turn on a television and watch what the other characters were up to when he was off-camera, then return to foil the plot.
 When announcer Bill Goodwin left after the first season, Burns hired announcer Harry Von Zell, a veteran of the Fred Allen and Eddie Cantor radio shows, to succeed him. Von Zell was cast as the good-natured, easily confused Burns and Allen announcer and buddy. He also became one of the show's running gags, when his involvement in Gracie's harebrained ideas would get him fired at least once a week by Burns.
 The first shows were simply a copy of the radio format, complete with lengthy and integrated commercials for sponsor Carnation Evaporated Milk by Goodwin. However, what worked well on radio appeared forced and plodding on television. The show was changed into the now-standard situation comedy format, with the commercials distinct from the plot.
 Midway through the run of the television show the Burns' two children, Sandra and Ronald, began to make appearances: Sandy in an occasional voice-over or brief on-air part (often as a telephone operator), and Ronnie in various small roles throughout the 4th and 5th seasons. Ronnie joined the regular cast in season 6. Typical of the blurred line between reality and fiction in the show, Ronnie played George and Gracie's on-air son, showing up in the second episode of season 6 ("Ronnie Arrives") with no explanation offered as to where he had been for the past five years of the show. Originally his character was an aspiring dramatic actor who held his parents' comedy style in befuddled contempt and deemed it unsuitable to the "serious" drama student. When the show's characters moved back to California in season 7 after spending the prior year in New York City, Ronnie's character dropped all apparent acting aspirations and instead enrolled in USC, becoming an inveterate girl chaser.

Burns and Allen also took a cue from Lucille Ball and Desi Arnaz's Desilu Productions and formed a company of their own, McCadden Corporation (named after the street on which Burns' brother lived), headquartered on the General Service Studio lot in the heart of Hollywood, and set up to film television shows and commercials. Besides their own hit show (which made the transition from a bi-weekly live series to a weekly filmed version in the fall of 1952), the couple's company produced such television series as The Bob Cummings Show (subsequently syndicated and rerun as Love That Bob); The People's Choice, starring Jackie Cooper; Mona McCluskey, starring Juliet Prowse; and Mister Ed, starring Alan Young and a talented "talking" horse. Several of their good friend Jack Benny's 1953–55 filmed episodes were also produced by McCadden for CBS as well.

The George Burns Show 
The George Burns and Gracie Allen Show ran on CBS Television from 1950 to 1958, when Burns at last consented to Allen's retirement. The onset of heart trouble in the early 1950s had left her exhausted from full-time work and she had been anxious to stop, but could not say "no" to Burns.

Burns attempted to continue the show (for new sponsor Colgate-Palmolive on NBC), but without Allen to provide the classic Gracie-isms, the show expired after a year.

Wendy and Me 
Burns subsequently created Wendy and Me, a sitcom in which he co-starred with Connie Stevens, Ron Harper, and J. Pat O'Malley. He acted primarily as the narrator, and secondarily as the adviser to Stevens' Gracie-like character. The first episode involved the nearly 69-year-old Burns watching his younger neighbor's activities with amusement, just as he would watch the Burns and Allen television show while it was unfolding to get a jump on what Gracie was up to in its final two seasons. Again as in the Burns and Allen television show, George frequently broke the fourth wall by commenting directly to viewers. The series only lasted a year. In a promotion, Burns had joked that "Connie Stevens plays Wendy, and I play 'me'."

The Sunshine Boys 
After Gracie's death in 1964, George immersed himself in work. McCadden Productions co-produced the television series No Time for Sergeants, based on the hit Broadway play; George also produced Juliet Prowse's 1965–66 NBC situation comedy, Mona McCluskey. At the same time, he toured the U.S. playing nightclub and theater engagements with such diverse partners as Carol Channing, Dorothy Provine, Jane Russell, Connie Haines, and Berle Davis. He also performed a series of solo concerts, playing university campuses, New York's Philharmonic Hall and winding up a successful season at Carnegie Hall, where he wowed a capacity audience with his show-stopping songs, dances, and jokes.

In 1974, Jack Benny signed to play one of the lead roles in the Metro-Goldwyn-Mayer film version of Neil Simon's The Sunshine Boys (Red Skelton was originally the other, but he objected to some of the script's language). Benny's health had begun to fail, however, and he advised his manager Irving Fein to let longtime friend Burns fill in for him on a series of nightclub dates to which Benny had committed around the U.S.

Burns, who enjoyed working, accepted the job for what would be his first feature film appearance for 36 years. As he recalled years later:
 "The happiest people I know are the ones that are still working. The saddest are the ones who are retired. Very few performers retire on their own. It's usually because no one wants them. Six years ago Sinatra announced his retirement. He's still 

Ill health had prevented Benny from working on The Sunshine Boys; he died of pancreatic cancer on December 26, 1974. Burns, heartbroken, said that the only time he ever wept in his life other than Gracie's death was when Benny died. He was chosen to give one of the eulogies at the funeral and said, "Jack was someone special to all of you, but he was so special to me ... I cannot imagine my life without Jack Benny, and I will miss him so very much." Burns then broke down and had to be helped to his seat. People who knew George said that he never could really come to terms with his beloved friend's death.

Six weeks before filming started, Burns had triple bypass surgery.

Burns replaced Benny in the film as well as the club tour, a move that turned out to be one of the biggest breaks of his career; his wise performance as faded vaudevillian Al Lewis won him the 1975 Academy Award for Best Supporting Actor, and permanently secured his career resurgence. At the age of 80, Burns was the oldest Oscar winner in the history of the Academy Awards, a record that would remain until Jessica Tandy won an Oscar for Driving Miss Daisy in 1989.

Oh, God! 
In 1977, Burns made another hit film, Oh, God!, playing the omnipotent title role opposite singer John Denver as an earnest but befuddled supermarket manager, whom God picks at random to revive his message. The image of Burns in a sailor's cap and light springtime jacket as the droll Almighty influenced his subsequent comedic work, as well as that of other comedians. At a celebrity roast in his honor, Dean Martin adapted a Burns crack: "When George was growing up, the Top 10 were the Ten Commandments".

Burns appeared in this character along with Vanessa Williams on the September 1984 cover of Penthouse magazine, the issue which contained the notorious nude photos of Williams, as well as the first appearance of underage pornographic film star Traci Lords. A blurb on the cover even announced "Oh God, she's nude!"

Oh, God! inspired two sequels Oh, God! Book II (in which the Almighty engages a precocious schoolgirl played by Louanne Sirota to spread the word) and Oh, God! You Devil—in which Burns played a dual role as God and the devil, with the soul of a would-be songwriter (played by Ted Wass) at stake.

Later films 
After guest-starring on The Muppet Show and Alice, Burns appeared in 1978's Sgt. Pepper's Lonely Hearts Club Band, the film based on The Beatles' album of the same name. In 1979, at the age of 83, Burns starred in two feature films, Just You and Me, Kid and Going in Style. Burns remained active in films and TV past his 90th birthday. One of his last films was 1988's 18 Again!, based on his half-novelty, half-country music-based hit single, "I Wish I Was 18 Again". In this film, Burns played an 81-year-old self-made millionaire industrialist who switched bodies with his awkward, artistic, 18-year-old grandson (played by Charlie Schlatter).

Burns also did regular nightclub stand-up acts in his later years, usually portraying himself as a lecherous old man. He always smoked a cigar onstage and reputedly timed his monologues by the amount the cigar had burned down. For this reason, he preferred cheap El Producto cigars as the loosely wrapped tobacco burned longer. Burns once quipped "In my youth, they called me a rebel. When I was middle-aged, they called me eccentric. Now that I'm old, I'm doing the same thing I've always done and they're calling me senile."

Arthur Marx estimated that Burns smoked around 300,000 cigars during his lifetime, starting at the age of 14. In his final years, he smoked no more than four a day and he never used cigarettes or marijuana, claiming "Look, I can't get any more kicks than I'm getting. What can marijuana do for me that show business hasn't done?" His last feature film role was the cameo role of Milt Lackey, a 100-year-old stand-up comedian, in the 1994 comedy mystery Radioland Murders.

Final years and death 

Burns was still appearing at major hotel/casinos in Las Vegas, Reno, and Lake Tahoe during the early 1980s. When Burns turned 90 in 1986, the city of Los Angeles renamed the northern end of Hamel Road "George Burns Road." City regulations prohibited naming a city street after a living person, but an exception was made for Burns. In celebration of Burns' 99th birthday in January 1995, Los Angeles renamed the eastern end of Alden Drive "Gracie Allen Drive." Burns was present at the unveiling ceremony (one of his last public appearances), where he quipped, "It's good to be here at the corner of Burns & Allen. At my age, it's good to be anywhere!" George Burns Road and Gracie Allen Drive cross just a few blocks west of the Beverly Center mall in the heart of the Cedars-Sinai Medical Center.  Burns served as honorary chairman of the Center's endowment drive.

Burns remained in good health for most of his life, in part thanks to a daily exercise regimen of swimming, walks, sit-ups, and push-ups. He bought new Cadillacs every year and drove until the age of 93. After that, Burns had chauffeurs drive him around. In his later years, he also had difficulty reading the fine print.

Then, Burns suffered a head injury after falling in his bathtub in July 1994 and underwent surgery to remove fluid in his skull. Burns never fully recovered and his performing career came to an end. In February 1995, Burns, in what would be his final television appearance, was presented with the very first SAG Lifetime Achievement Award by the Screen Actors Guild. In December of that year, a month before his 100th birthday, Burns was well enough to attend a Christmas party hosted by Frank Sinatra (who turned 80 that month), where he reportedly caught the flu, which weakened him further. When Burns was 96, he had signed a lifetime contract with Caesars Palace in Las Vegas to perform stand-up comedy there, which included the guarantee of a show on his centenary, January 20, 1996. When that day actually came, however, he was too weak to deliver the planned performance. He released a statement joking about how he would love for his 100th birthday to have "a night with Sharon Stone."

On March 9, 1996, 49 days after his centenary, Burns died in his Beverly Hills home. His funeral was held three days later at the Wee Kirk o' the Heather church in Forest Lawn Memorial Park Cemetery, Glendale. As much as he looked forward to reaching the age of 100, Burns also stated, about a year before he died, that he also looked forward to death, saying that on the day he would die, he would be with Gracie again in Heaven. Upon being interred with Gracie, the crypt's marker was changed from, "Grace Allen Burns—Beloved Wife And Mother (1902–1964)" to "Gracie Allen (1902–1964) & George Burns (1896–1996)—Together Again". George had always said that he wanted Gracie to have top billing.

Legacy 

George Burns has three stars on the Hollywood Walk of Fame: a motion pictures star at 1639 Vine Street, a television star at 6510 Hollywood Boulevard, and a live performance star at 6672 Hollywood Boulevard. The first two stars were placed during the initial installations of 1960, while the third-star ceremony was held in 1984, in the new category of live performance, or live theatre, established that year. Burns is also a member of the Television Hall of Fame, where he and Gracie Allen were both inducted in 1988.

He is the subject of Rupert Holmes's one-actor play Say Goodnight, Gracie.

Bibliography 
Burns was a bestselling author who wrote ten books:

Filmography 
Features

The Big Broadcast (1932) as Himself
International House (1933) as Doctor Burns
College Humor (1933) as Himself
Six of a Kind (1934) as George Edward
We're Not Dressing (1934) as Himself
Many Happy Returns (1934) as Himself
Love in Bloom (1935) as Himself
Here Comes Cookie (1935) as Himself
The Big Broadcast of 1936 (1935) as Himself
The Big Broadcast of 1937 (1936) as Mr. Platt
College Holiday (1936) as George Hymen
Winterset (1936)
A Damsel in Distress (1937) as Himself
College Swing (1938) as George Jonas
Honolulu (1939) as Joe Duffy
The Solid Gold Cadillac (1956) as the Narrator (voice)
The Sunshine Boys (1975) as Al Lewis
Oh, God! (1977) as God
Movie Movie (1978) as Himself – Introductory Segments (uncredited)
Sgt. Pepper's Lonely Hearts Club Band (1978) as Mr. Kite
Just You and Me, Kid (1979) as Bill
Going in Style (1979) as Joe
Oh, God! Book II (1980) as God
Two of a Kind (1982) as Ross "Boppy" Minor
Oh, God! You Devil (1984) as God / Harry O. Tophet
18 Again! (1988) as Jack Watson / David Watson
A Century of Cinema (1994) (documentary)
Radioland Murders (1994) as Milt Lackey (last film appearance)

Short subjects

Lambchops (1929) as George the Boyfriend
Fit to Be Tied (1930) as a Tie Customer
Pulling a Bone (1931) as a Man with a Bone
The Antique Shop (1931) as Customer
Once Over, Light (1931) as a Barbershop Customer
100% Service (1931) as George
Oh, My Operation (1932) as the New Patient
The Babbling Book (1932) as George
Your Hat (1932) as a Hat Salesman
Let's Dance (1933) as George, a Sailor
Hollywood on Parade No. A-9 (1933) as Himself (uncredited)
Walking the Baby (1933) as George
Screen Snapshots: Famous Fathers and Sons (1946) as Himself
Screen Snapshots: Hollywood Grows Up (1954)
Screen Snapshots: Hollywood Beauty (1955) as Himself
All About People (1967) as Narrator
A Look at the World of Soylent Green (1973) as Himself
The Lion Roars Again (1975) as Himself

Discography

Albums

Singles

Soundtracks 
1978 – Sgt. Pepper's Lonely Hearts Club Band (soundtrack)
1996 – Music From The Life: A New Musical (soundtrack)

Radio series 
 The Robert Burns Panatella Show 1932–1933; CBS
 In their debut series, George and Gracie shared the bill with Guy Lombardo and his orchestra. The pair launched themselves into national stardom with their first major publicity stunt, Gracie's ongoing search for her missing brother.
 The White Owl Program 1933–1934; CBS
 The Adventures of Gracie 1934–1935; CBS
 The Campbell's Tomato Juice Program 1935–1937; CBS
 The Grape Nuts Program 1937–1938; NBC
 The Chesterfield Program 1938–1939; CBS
 The Hinds Honey and Almond Cream Program 1939–1940; CBS
 This series featured another wildly successful publicity stunt which had Gracie running for President of the United States.
 The Hormel Program 1940–1941; NBC
 Advertised a brand new product called Spam; this show featured musical numbers by jazz great Artie Shaw.
 The Swan Soap Show 1941–1945; NBC, CBS
 This series featured a radical format change, in that George and Gracie played themselves as a married couple for the first time, and the show became a full-fledged domestic situation comedy. This was George's response to a marked drop in ratings under the old "Flirtation Act" format (as he later recalled, he finally realized "our jokes are too young for us").
 Maxwell House Coffee Time 1945–1949; NBC
 The Amm-i-Dent Toothpaste Show 1949–1950; CBS

TV series 
 The George Burns and Gracie Allen Show 1950–1958; CBS
 Broadcast live every other week for the first two seasons, 26 episodes per year. Starting in the third season, all episodes were filmed and broadcast weekly, 40 episodes per year. A total of 291 episodes were created.
 The George Burns Show 1958–1959; NBC
 An unsuccessful attempt to continue the format of the Burns and Allen show without Gracie, the rest of the cast intact.
 Wendy and Me 1964–1965; ABC
 George plays narrator in this short-lived series, just as he had in the Burns and Allen show, but with far less on-screen time, as the focus is on a young couple played by Connie Stevens and Ron Harper. Stevens is, essentially, playing a version of Gracie's character.
 George Burns Comedy Week 1985; CBS
 Another short-lived series, a weekly comedy anthology program whose only connecting thread was George's presence as host. He does not appear in any of the actual storylines. He was 89 years old when the series was produced.

See also 
 List of actors with Academy Award nominations

References

Further reading 
 Gottfried, Martin (1996). George Burns. Simon & Schuster.
 Young, Jordan R. (1999). The Laugh Crafters: Comedy Writing in Radio & TV's Golden Age. Beverly Hills: Past Times Publishing. .
 Burns, George (1989). All My Best Friends. G.P. Putnam's Sons

External links 

 
 
 
 Home of George Burns & Gracie Allen-Radio Television Mirror-December 1940 (page 17)
 
 FBI Records: The Vault – George Burns at vault.fbi.gov

1896 births
1996 deaths
20th-century American comedians
20th-century American Jews
20th-century American male actors
American centenarians
American male film actors
American male radio actors
American male television actors
American people of Polish-Jewish descent
American people of Romanian-Jewish descent
Best Musical or Comedy Actor Golden Globe (film) winners
Best Supporting Actor Academy Award winners
Burials at Forest Lawn Memorial Park (Glendale)
 
Grammy Award winners
Jewish American comedians
Jewish American male actors
Jewish male comedians
Kennedy Center honorees
Comedians from New York City
Male actors from New York City
People of Galician-Jewish descent
Vaudeville performers
Writers from New York City